USS may refer to:

Arts, entertainment, and media
 Ubiquitous Synergy Seeker, a Canadian band, also known as USS or U.S.S.
 Universal Studios Singapore, a theme park in Singapore

Businesses and organizations
 Union of Sovereign States, the planned successor to the Soviet Union
 Union Switch & Signal, a supplier of railroad switching equipment
 Union Syndicale Suisse, the Swiss Trade Union Confederation
 United Seamen's Service,  a non-profit, federally chartered organization founded in 1942
 United State of Saurashtra,  a separate, western State within the Union of India from 1948 until 1956
 United States Senate, the upper chamber of the United States Congress
 U.S. Steel Corporation
 USA Swimming, formerly United States Swimming, the national governing body for competitive swimming in the US
 Universities Superannuation Scheme, a pension scheme in the United Kingdom
 United Peasant Party (Ujedinjena seljačka stranka), a political party in Serbia

Computing
 Unformatted System Services, the mechanism within VTAM to format a session's logmode and application. An equivalent facility in TN3270 also specifies a logon screen.
UNIX System Services, a component of z/OS that provides Unix compatibility
 Upload Speed Sense, a method of regulating a host's upload bandwidth in the eMule client

Health care
 Ultrasound scan, a scientific and medical imaging technique (usually refers to medical ultrasound)
 Upshaw–Schulman syndrome, the recessively inherited form of thrombotic thrombocytopenic purpura
 Universal Spinal System, an implantable device (instrumentation) system for correcting scoliosis

Schools
 University of Southern Somalia
 Uxbridge Secondary School, a high school in Uxbridge, Ontario, Canada

Other uses
 United States Ship, typically as a ship prefix in the United States Navy (includes submarines)
 United States Standard, an older standard of screw thread
 In the fictional Star Trek universe, either United Space Ship or United Star Ship